Pterocarpus dalbergioides, the Andaman padauk, Andaman redwood or East Indian mahogany, is a species of flowering plant in the family Fabaceae. It is sometimes called "narra", but this is just a generic term used for any of several Pterocarpus species. It is native to the Andaman Islands.

Description 
This is a large evergreen tree, with ascending branches spreading towards the tips. Has more numerous leaflets than the similar Pterocarpus indicus. The leaflets are ovate-lanceolate and acuminate, with 5 to 8 pairs of conspicuous secondary nerves. The fruit pod is a winged achene or samara that is nearly hairless and about 5 cm in diameter. The heartwood colour varies from light grey to deep reddish-brown, but this variation is unrelated to any differences in leaves or flowers.

Distribution 
The species is native and endemic to the Andaman Islands, India.

Gallery

References

dalbergioides
Flora of the Andaman Islands
Data deficient plants
Taxonomy articles created by Polbot